The Court of Appeal of Uganda (also constituted as the Constitutional Court of Uganda) is the second-highest judicial organ in Uganda. It derives its powers from Article 134 of the 1995 Constitution. It is an appellate court when hearing cases appealed from the High Court of Uganda. However, it has original jurisdiction when adjudicating matters relating to the constitutionality of matters before it. All judgments by the Court of Appeal are theoretically appealable to the Supreme Court of Uganda, if the Supreme Court decides to hear the appeal.

Location
The Court of Appeal of Uganda is located in Twed Towers, on the fourth floor, along Kafu Road, in the neighborhood called Nakasero, in the Central Division of Kampala, the capital and largest city in Uganda. The geographical coordinates of the offices of the Uganda Court of Appeal are: 0°19'34.0"N, 32°35'01.0"E (Latitude:0.326111; Longitude:32.583611).

Overview
The Court of Appeal of Uganda is headed by the deputy chief justice and has fourteen other justices. The quorum required for a court decision varies depending on the matters under consideration. When sitting as an appellate court in a civil or criminal matter, the required quorum is an odd number of justices, not less than three in number. When sitting to consider a constitutional matter, quorum is achieved by an odd number of justices, not less than five. In Uganda, the Deputy Chief Justice is not a member of the Supreme Court.

Composition
The Justices of the Court of Appeal of Uganda are headed by the Deputy Chief Justice of Uganda. The following are the justices of the Court of Appeal of Uganda, as of 20 August 2020:

 Richard Buteera (Deputy Chief Justice)
 Martin Stephen Egonda-Ntende 
 Remmy Kasule                                               
 Irene Mulyagonja                                 
 Kenneth Kakuru                                             
 Monica Mugenyi
 Geoffrey Kiryabwire
 Elizabeth Musoke
 Hellen Obura
 Catherine Bamugemereire (On secondment to Uganda Land Tribunal)
 Barishaki Cheborion
 Simon Mugenyi Byabakama (On secondment to Uganda Electoral Commission)
 Christopher Izama Madrama
 Stephen Musota
 Muzamiru Kibeedi Mutangula

List of deputy chief justices

See also
Politics of Uganda
Supreme Court of Uganda
High Court of Uganda

References

External links
Website of the Judiciary of Uganda 

Government of Uganda
Courts in Uganda
Law of Uganda
Judiciary of Uganda
1995 establishments in Uganda